There are many foreign football players in the German professional football leagues. As of November 2009, there are 249 foreign players in the Bundesliga, resulting in a foreigner ratio of 45%. In the 2. Bundesliga, there are 145 foreign players – a ratio of 31%. In the 3. Liga, the foreigner ratio is 15%.

Rulings
For the 2006–07 season, the limits on foreign (non-EU) players were lifted, based on a decision of the German Football Association (DFB) and Deutsche Fußball Liga made on 21 December 2005. At the same time, the UEFA local player ruling was introduced. This ruling stipulates, that a certain number of locally produced players must be enrolled at each club. For the 2006–07 season, this was at least four such players, for the 2007–08 season six players and for the 2008–09 season eight such players.

A locally produced player is a player who, during the age of 15–21 years, was licensed to play for the club for three different seasons or years.

Ratio of foreign players
Data from season 2009–10.

Countries
With 42 players, Brazil is the country with the most nationals playing in the German professional football leagues. Thirty of them played for clubs in the highest level in 2009–10. Only four clubs in the 1. Bundesliga were totally without Brazilian players: VfL Bochum, SC Freiburg, 1. FSV Mainz 05 and 1. FC Nürnberg. Below the highest league level, the number of Brazilians drops rapidly: ten Brazilians play in the 2. Bundesliga, and only two in the 3. Liga.
In recent years, the Turks have been 43 players.

The following table lists the nationality of players in the three professional football leagues of Germany.

Americas

Europe

Africa

Middle East

Asia and Oceania

See also
List of foreign Bundesliga players

References

 
Association football player non-biographical articles